Greatest Hits is a compilation album by the American rock band, The Hooters released in 1992.

Background
Greatest Hits contains songs from The Hooters' three albums on Columbia Records: Nervous Night (1985), One Way Home (1987) and Zig Zag (1989).

Track listing 
 "All You Zombies" (Rob Hyman, Eric Bazilian) – 5:57
 "Satellite" (Rob Hyman, Eric Bazilian, Rick Chertoff) – 4:15
 "And We Danced" (Rob Hyman, Eric Bazilian) – 3:48
 "500 Miles" (Hedy West, additional lyrics by Rob Hyman, Eric Bazilian, Rick Chertoff) – 4:24
 "Don't Knock It 'Til You Try It" (Rob Hyman, Eric Bazilian) – 4:17
 "Day by Day" (Rob Hyman, Eric Bazilian, Rick Chertoff) – 3:25
 "Where Do the Children Go" (Rob Hyman, Eric Bazilian) – 5:28
 "Johnny B" (Rob Hyman, Eric Bazilian, Rick Chertoff) – 3:59
 "Fightin' on the Same Side" (Rob Hyman, Eric Bazilian, Rick Chertoff) – 4:07
 "Brother, Don't You Walk Away" (Rob Hyman, Eric Bazilian, Rick Chertoff) – 4:27
 "Karla With a K" (The Hooters) – 4:40
 "Nervous Night" (Rob Hyman, Eric Bazilian, Rick Chertoff) – 3:57
 "Give The Music Back" (Rob Hyman, Eric Bazilian) – 5:15
 "Mr. Big Baboon'" (Rob Hyman, Eric Bazilian, Rick Chertoff) – 3:54

Charts

References 

The Hooters albums
1992 greatest hits albums
Columbia Records compilation albums
Sony BMG compilation albums
Albums produced by Rob Hyman